Şaka (10+1) (commonly known simply as Şaka and 10+1), is the fourth studio album by Turkish girl group Hepsi, expected to be released in May 2008. The album is the group's third album so far, and is the follow-up from their 2006 album Hepsi 2, which spawned the hit singles "Kalpsizsin" and "Aşk Sakızı".

Album title
The album's title Şaka (10+1) in English means "Joke (10+1)". The "(10+1)" section of the title refers to the fact that the album consists of 11 tracks, 10 of which are famous covers, with an addition of 1 new track. The group entitled the album Joke, as all the cover songs were written by the previous artist with deep meaningful reason; however, the group stated that the tracks were songs that they grew up listening to as a child, so the same meaning of the song isn't intended and isn't to be taken so seriously.

The group's debut album was entitled Bir, translating to "One", and their previous album was named Hepsi 2, which made fans speculate that the new album would be entitled Hepsi 3 or Üç. In binary, "10+1" can be interpreted as 3.

History
The album was initially supposed to be released in the summer of 2007, however the album was not released and no information regarding the album was given. In November 2007 Hepsi confirmed in an interview with the press that they were in the process of picking songs to record, and were going to begin recording the tracks at the end of December 2007.

Style
Şaka (10+1) is noticeably different from other albums released from the group; this is due to it mostly consisting of cover songs. The group's first album Bir was mostly praised for the up-tempo songs which featured on the album whereas their second album was praised for the lyrics. However, with most of the songs on Şaka (10+1) being covers, the album is noticeably more vocally challenged than the other releases. The vocals are more diverse and vocal roles are shared more equally than the previous releases. The album, however, isn't dull and an imitation of the previous artists efforts, but is revived not only by vocals, but with added new up-tempo beats. This adds a sense of edge to the album, especially as the album features rap vocals from group member Eren, which fits right into the songs. In an interview with the Turkish music magazine Blue Jean, band leader Gülçin said their style went more pop with the addition of rock and electronic music elements, unlike their first two albums Bir and Hepsi 2, since they are more influenced from R&B and dance-pop.

Promotion

On May 24, 2008 at 20:30 (GMT+2), Group Hepsi will hold a concert at "Turkcell kuruçeşme arena", to perform the new album to fans for the first time.

On May 16, 2008, the group feature on Tatlises Radyo to promote their new album. The show was the first time the public heard previews of the new songs.  They also stated that they were going to hold concerts at several cities.  One of which was Ankara where they will perform on June 8.

On May 26, 2008 Hepsi appeared on "Duru Muhabbetler" talkshow were they performed several songs from the album including "Hep Bana", "Tavla" and "Aşk Herşeyi Affeder Mi?" At the talk show, Hepsi announced that they will be releasing "Hepsi" stationary, "Hepsi" bags and "Hepsi" T-shirts.

Tracks
The album consists of 11 tracks, 10 cover songs and 1 new song. This confirms that the two tracks Hepsi recorded for the Winx Club movie soundtrack, "Sen Bir Tanesin" and "Sadece Bir Kiz", won't feature on the album as the only original song to feature on the album has been confirmed to be "4 Peynirli Pizza". The album originally wasn't going to contain any new material, however whilst recording the cover songs Kenan Dogulu had written a new song and offered it to the group. The group accepted the offer and as of May 12, 2008 the music video for "4 Peynirli Pizza" has been recorded.

Track listing
 4 Peynirli Pizza (4 cheesed pizza's)
 İyisin (Your fine)
 Yanlızlığım (My loneliness)
 Hep Bana (All for me)
 Aşk Herşeyi Affeder mi? (Does love forgive everything?)
 Yaz Yaz Yaz (ft. Mustafa Ceceli) (Write Write Write)
 Beni Kategorize Etme (Don't categorize me)
 Tavla (attemper)
 Sakın Gelme (Don't you dare come)
 Onu Alma Beni Al (Don't have her, have me)
 Sımsıkı (firmly )

Releases

Radio charting songs

External links 
 Grup Hepsi 
 Grup Hepsi Fan Site

References 

Hepsi albums
2008 albums